Asphondylia antennariae is a species of gall midge in the family Cecidomyiidae. The larvae of this species induce galls on the buds of Antennaria plantaginifolia. This species is known from Wisconsin and Maine in the United States, though it's host plant is widespread in eastern North America. It was first described by American entomologist William Morton Wheeler in 1889.

References

Cecidomyiinae
Insects described in 1889
 Diptera of North America
 Gall-inducing insects

Taxa named by William Morton Wheeler